Serges Pascal Wawa Sfondo (born 1 January 1986 in Bingerville) is an Ivorian footballer who currently plays as a defender for Singida Big Stars F.C. in the Tanzanian Premier League.

Career
He began his career in 2003 at ASEC Mimosas. On 19 January 2009, he was on trial at FC Lorient.  
In December 2010, he joined the Sudanese club, Al-Merrikh, on a 3-year deal.
In November 2014, he signed with Azam F.C., a football club in Tanzanian Premier League.

International career
He represented his country at the 2008 Olympic Games and played 4 games. He played in the Toulon Tournament of 2008 for the Ivory Coast U23.

References

External links
 

1986 births
Living people
Ivorian footballers
ASEC Mimosas players
Footballers at the 2008 Summer Olympics
Olympic footballers of Ivory Coast
Ivorian expatriate footballers
Expatriate footballers in Tanzania
Al-Merrikh SC players
People from Bingerville
Azam F.C. players
Association football defenders
Association football midfielders